E 461 is a European B class road in Czech Republic and Austria, connecting the cities Svitavy, Brno, and Vienna.

Route 
 
 Svitavy
 E50, E65, E462 Brno
 
 E49, E58, E59, E60 Vienna

External links 
 UN Economic Commission for Europe: Overall Map of E-road Network (2007)
 International E-road network

International E-road network
Roads in the Czech Republic
Roads in Austria